Arnold Christopher "Kit" Denton (5 May 1928 – 14 April 1997), originally Arnold Ditkofsky, was a prominent Australian writer and broadcaster. Denton was born in England and was of Polish Jewish descent. He is the father of comedian and television presenter Andrew Denton.

Early life
Denton was born in the London suburb of Stepney and was raised in the East End. He joined the British Army where he served with the British Forces Broadcasting Service in Germany. Denton emigrated to Australia in the late 1940s, and worked as a gold miner in Kalgoorlie, Western Australia.

Broadcasting and writing career in Australia
From 1951 until 1965, Denton worked for the Australian Broadcasting Commission as an announcer, and eventually moved on to screenwriting, producing and directing television. In the 1970s, an anonymous television critic for The Australian newspaper was revealed to be Kit Denton, writing under the pseudonym "Janus".

Denton had an abiding interest in military history, and is best known for his novel The Breaker (1973), based on the story of Breaker Morant. Although it was widely assumed that the film Breaker Morant was based on Denton's book, it was in fact based on a play by Kenneth G. Ross, who successfully sued publisher Angus & Robertson when they publicised Denton's novel as the source for the film. Denton also wrote For Queen and Commonwealth, about British military forces in the late 19th century, and Gallipoli: One Long Grave (1986), a book about the Battle of Gallipoli.

Death
Denton died in April 1997 at his home in the Blue Mountains, New South Wales.

Legacy
In August 2006, Denton's son Andrew announced a new A$25,000 writing scholarship in his father's name: the Kit Denton Fellowship, which would be presented to members of the Australian Writers' Guild from 2007 onwards.

Bibliography
 A Walk Around My Cluttered Mind (1968)
 The Breaker: a novel (1973)
 The Thinkable Man (1976)
 The Breaker: a novel, with a selection of the verse of Harry (the Breaker) Morant / Kit Denton (1980, revised edition )
 Gallipoli illustrated / compiled and written by Kit Denton (1981)
 Closed File: The True Story Behind the Execution of Breaker Morant and Peter Handcock (1983)
 Fiddlers Bridge (1986)
 Gallipoli, One Long Grave (1986)
 For Queen and Commonwealth (1987)
 Red on White (1991)

Credits
 Demonstrator (1971) – screenplay

References

External links
 Kit and Betty Denton, Port Moresby, Papua New Guinea, 1953 – photography by Terence and Margaret Spencer
 Address delivered by Kit Denton, to the Canberra Times literary luncheon, 12 October 1983 (sound recording) – introduction by Graham Wilkinson and Peter Fuller
 "Andrew Denton", episode on Who Do you think you Are

1928 births
1997 deaths
20th-century Australian novelists
Australian male novelists
20th-century Australian non-fiction writers
British Army soldiers
People from the Blue Mountains (New South Wales)
People from Stepney
English emigrants to Australia
Australian people of Polish-Jewish descent
20th-century Australian male writers